Zhang Wenbing (born November 1971) is a Chinese university administrator and politician, currently serving head of the Organization Department of Hubei Provincial Committee of the Chinese Communist Party.

He is an alternate member of the 20th Central Committee of the Chinese Communist Party.

Biography
Zhang was born in Huoqiu County, Anhui, in November 1971. In 1990, he was accepted to the Renmin University of China, where he majored in agricultural economic management. Upon graduation, he joined the Chinese Communist Party (CCP) in June 1994. He receive his master's degree in economic in 2003 from Anhui University.

After university in 1994, Zhang worked at West Anhui United University (now West Anhui University), where he was promoted to vice president in March 2005 and to president in August 2011. He became president of Hefei University in October 2013, and served until August 2016.

Zhang began his political career in August 2016, when he was assigned to director of the Product Quality Supervision Department of the General Administration of Quality Supervision, Inspection and Quarantine, he remained in that position until January 2020, when he was reassigned as director of the Standards and Technology Management Department.

Zhang was  transferred to central China's Hubei province in June 2020. He was appointed vice governor in July and four months later was admitted to member of the Standing Committee of the CCP Hubei Provincial Committee, the province's top authority. He was chosen as head of the Organization Department of CCP Hubei Provincial Committee in March 2022.

References

1971 births
Living people
People from Huoqiu County
Renmin University of China alumni
Anhui University alumni
People's Republic of China politicians from Anhui
Chinese Communist Party politicians from Anhui
Alternate members of the 20th Central Committee of the Chinese Communist Party